The John Boyden House, at 47 W. Center St. in Coalville, Utah, was built in 1860.  It was listed on the National Register of Historic Places in 1982.

It includes Gothic Revival and Victorian architecture.

See also
Boyden Block, also NRHP-listed in Coalville

References

External links

		
National Register of Historic Places in Summit County, Utah
Gothic Revival architecture in Utah
Houses completed in 1860